The 2019 Liga 1 de Fútbol Profesional (known as the 2019 Liga 1 Movistar for sponsorship reasons) was the 103rd season of the highest division of Peruvian football. A total of 18 teams competed in the season, with Sporting Cristal coming in as defending champions.

Binacional were the champions, winning their first league title by defeating Alianza Lima in the finals by a 4–3 aggregate score.

Competition format
The season will be divided into three stages: Torneo Apertura, Torneo Clausura, and the Playoffs.

The first and second stages will be two smaller Apertura and Clausura tournaments of 17 games each. Each team will play the other teams once during the Apertura tournament and once during the Clausura tournament in reversed order for a total of 34 matches. Points earned during the Apertura will not carry over during the Clausura. The winners of the Apertura and Clausura stages will qualify to the playoffs along with the top two teams of the aggregate table, as long as they end in the top nine of this table at the end of the season.

The playoffs to decide the national champion will be contested by four teams, which will play two semifinals with the winners playing the final. In every stage of the playoffs, the teams with the most points on the aggregate table will choose which leg they play as the home team. If the teams are tied in points after the two legs of the final, a third match on neutral ground will be played to decide the national champion. If a team wins both the Apertura and Clausura, the playoffs will not be played and that team will be declared as champion.

Qualification to international competitions will be as follows: the top four teams of the aggregate table will qualify for the 2020 Copa Libertadores, while the next three best teams in that table will qualify for the 2020 Copa Sudamericana, with a fourth berth being allocated to the 2019 Copa Bicentenario winners. In case the Copa Bicentenario winners have already qualified for an international competition, the eighth best team in the aggregate table will also qualify for the Copa Sudamericana. The two teams with the fewest points in the aggregate table at the end of the season will be relegated.

Teams
A total of 18 teams have been confirmed to play in the 2019 Liga 1, an increase of two teams from the previous season. The top fourteen teams in the 2018 Torneo Descentralizado will take part, along with Segunda División champions Universidad César Vallejo, Copa Perú champions Pirata, and the top two teams of the promotion play-offs (Carlos A. Mannucci and Alianza Universidad). The four promoted teams will replace Sport Rosario and Comerciantes Unidos, who were relegated to the Segunda División at the end of the previous season.

Stadia and locations

Managerial changes

Torneo Apertura

Standings

Results

Torneo Clausura

Standings

Results

Aggregate table
Both stages (Torneo Apertura and Torneo Clausura) of the 2019 season were aggregated into a single league table throughout the season to determine two of the teams that will qualify for the playoffs and the Copa Libertadores and three Copa Sudamericana qualifiers, as well as those to be relegated at the end of the season.

Playoffs

Semi-final

First leg

Second leg

Alianza Lima won 2–1 on aggregate and advanced to the Finals.

Finals
It is the first Liga 1 final to incorporate the use of the video assistant referee (VAR) review system.

First leg

Second leg

Binacional won 4–3 on aggregate.

Top goalscorers
{| class="wikitable" border="1"
|-
! Rank
! Name
! Club
! Goals
|-
| align=center | 1
| Bernardo Cuesta
|Melgar
| align=center | 27
|-
| align=center | 2
| Donald Millán
|Binacional
| align=center | 23
|-
| align=center | 3
| Kevin Quevedo
|Alianza Lima
| align=center | 17
|-
| rowspan=2 align=center | 4
| Mauricio Montes
|Ayacucho
| rowspan=2 align=center | 15
|-
| Santiago Silva
|Universidad César Vallejo
|-
| rowspan=2 align=center | 6
| Sebastián Gularte
|Unión Comercio
| rowspan=2 align=center | 14
|-
| Carlos Neumann
|Sport Huancayo
|-
| align=center | 8
| Cristian Palacios
|Sporting Cristal
| align=center | 13
|-
| align=center | 9
| Joffre Escobar
|Universidad San Martín
| align=center | 12
|-
| align=center | 10
| Aldair Rodríguez
|Binacional
| align=center | 11
|}

Source: ADFP

Liga 1 awards
On 10 January 2020, the Liga 1 announced the nominees for the 2019 Liga 1 awards. The award ceremony was held on 16 January 2020, 19:00 PET (UTC−5), at the Teatro Municipal de Lima. The winners were chosen based on voting by coaches and captains of Liga 1 teams as well as by 60 journalists. Votes from Liga 1 fans on social media were also considered.

The following awards were also awarded:
Top goalscorer:  Bernardo Cuesta from Melgar (27 goals).
Fair Play award: Sport Huancayo.
Best supporters: Alianza Lima fans (244,242 home attendance during the season).

Best XI
The best XI team of the 2019 Liga 1 season was also announced during the award ceremony.

See also
 2019 Copa Bicentenario
 2019 Torneo de Promoción y Reserva
 2019 Liga 2
 2019 Cuadrangular de Ascenso
 2019 Copa Perú

References

External links
Official website 
Tournament regulations  
Torneo Descentralizado news at Peru.com 
Torneo Descentralizado statistics and news at Dechalaca.com 
Torneo Descentralizado statistics and news at The Peruvian Waltz 

 

2019
2019 in Peruvian football